The 1989–90 La Salle Explorers men's basketball team represented La Salle University during the 1989–90 NCAA Division I men's basketball season. Led by fourth-year head coach Speedy Morris, the team established the single-season school record for wins with a 30-2 record (16-0 MAAC), including a 22-game win streak. National Player of the Year Lionel "L-Train" Simmons finished his collegiate career third in NCAA scoring with 3,217 points, and also accumulated 1,429 rebounds. He was the first player in NCAA history to score more than 3,000 points and grab more than 1,100 rebounds.

Roster

Schedule and results

|-
!colspan=12 style=| Regular season

|-
!colspan=12 style=| MAAC Tournament

|-
!colspan=12 style=| NCAA Tournament

Sources

Rankings

*Final AP and Coaches rankings released prior to NCAA tournament

Awards and honors
 Lionel Simmons, Adolph Rupp Trophy
 Lionel Simmons, Associated Press College Basketball Player of the Year
 Lionel Simmons, First Team All-Big 5 selection
 Lionel Simmons, Robert V. Geasey Trophy
 Lionel Simmons, Metro Atlantic Athletic Conference Player of the Year
 Lionel Simmons, Naismith College Player of the Year
 Lionel Simmons, USBWA College Player of the Year
 Lionel Simmons, State Farm Division I Player of the Year Award
 Lionel Simmons, John R. Wooden Award

Team players drafted into the NBA

References

La Salle Explorers men's basketball seasons
La Salle Explorers
La Salle
La
La